John Leadbitter (born 7 May 1953) is an English former footballer who played as a central defender in the Football League for Darlington. He began his senior career with Sunderland without playing for them in the League.

References

1953 births
Living people
Footballers from Sunderland
English footballers
Association football defenders
Sunderland A.F.C. players
Darlington F.C. players
English Football League players